Robert Dauphin (5 February 1905 – 18 July 1961) was a French footballer. He competed in the men's tournament at the 1928 Summer Olympics.

References

External links
 

1905 births
1961 deaths
French footballers
France international footballers
Olympic footballers of France
Footballers at the 1928 Summer Olympics
Sportspeople from Saint-Malo
Association football midfielders
Footballers from Brittany
Stade Français (association football) players